Aristaeus the Elder (370 – 300 BC) was a Greek mathematician who worked on conic sections. He was a contemporary of Euclid.

Life
Only little is known of his life. The mathematician Pappus of Alexandria refers to him as Aristaeus the Elder. Pappus gave Aristaeus great credit for a work entitled Five Books concerning Solid Loci which was used by Pappus but has been lost. He may have also authored the book  Concerning the Comparison of Five Regular Solids. This book has also been lost; it is known through a reference by the Greek mathematician Hypsicles.

Heath 1921 notes, "Hypsicles (who lived in Alexandria) says also that Aristaeus, in a work entitled Comparison of the five figures, proved that the same circle circumscribes both the pentagon of the dodecahedron and the triangle of the icosahedron inscribed in the same sphere; whether this Aristaeus is the same as the Aristaeus of the Solid Loci, the elder contemporary of Euclid, we do not know."

References

Further reading

External links 
 

Ancient Greek mathematicians
4th-century BC Greek people
4th-century BC mathematicians